Filley may refer to one of the following:

People
 Chauncey Filley, American politician
 Mark Filley, American baseball player
 Oliver Filley, American politician
 Pat Filley, American football player and coach
 William Filley, English founder of Windsor, Connecticut

Places
 Filley, Missouri
 Filley, Nebraska
 Filley Township, Gage County, Nebraska